The year 1985 in architecture involved some significant architectural events and new buildings.

Events
The Inman Report is released, with major implications for the architecture of United States embassies.
International architectural firm Aedas is established by Keith Griffiths in Hong Kong as Hackett and Griffiths.

Buildings and structures

Buildings opened

January 15 – The Tashkent Tower in Tashkent, Uzbekistan begins operation after six years construction.
March 2 – Columbia Center (formerly the Bank of America Tower) in Seattle, Washington, United States.
June 4 – Farø Bridges, Denmark.
July – The DLI 63 Building in Seoul, South Korea.
August 10 – St. Paul's Cathedral, Abidjan, Ivory Coast, designed by Aldo Spirito, is consecrated by the Pope.
September 7 – The first concert is held at the Scottish Exhibition and Conference Centre in Glasgow, Scotland.

Buildings completed
November 18 – HSBC Headquarters Building in Hong Kong.
Central State Museum of Kazakhstan.
 The Bank of America Plaza in Dallas, Texas, United States.
Several notable buildings in Manhattan, New York City, United States:
The first tower in the World Financial Center.
New York Marriott Marquis.
Tower 49.
 Amarin Plaza in Bangkok, designed by Rangsan Torsuwan.
 Pak Sha O Youth Hostel in Hong Kong, designed by Rocco Design Architects.
 Hundertwasserhaus in Vienna.
 The Sender Eifel-Bärbelkreuz in Hellenthal, Germany.
 Tyholttårnet in Trondheim, Norway.
 Calgary Municipal Building in Calgary
 Spiral in Tokyo, Japan.
 Mjøsa Bridge, Norway.
 Nanjing Massacre Memorial Hall, Nanjing, China.
 Reconstruction of Basilica of St. Cunibert, Cologne, after bombing of Cologne in World War II.
 Thematic House (remodeled structure) by Charles Jencks, Terry Farrell, Michael Graves and others in Holland Park, Kensington, London, United Kingdom.

Awards
AIA Gold Medal – William Wayne Caudill (posthumous)
Alvar Aalto Medal – Tadao Ando
Architecture Firm Award – Venturi, Rauch and Scott Brown
Grand prix national de l'architecture – Michel Andrault and Pierre Parat
Pritzker Prize – Hans Hollein
RAIA Gold Medal – Richard Johnson
RIBA Royal Gold Medal – Richard Rogers
Twenty-five Year Award – General Motors Technical Center

Births

Deaths
September 30 – Herbert Bayer, Austrian and American graphic designer, painter, photographer, sculptor, art director, environmental and interior designer and architect (born 1900)
November 13 – William Pereira, American architect of Portuguese ancestry (born 1909)
November 22 – Gudolf Blakstad, Norwegian architect (born 1893)
Dewi-Prys Thomas, Welsh architect (born 1916)

References

 
20th-century architecture